Corydoras seussi is a South American catfish, family Callichthyidae. It was named after German ichthyologist Dr Werner Seuss. It quite strongly resembles the Corydoras gossei. However, it can be differentiated by its longer snout; nonetheless, it is not a 'true' longnose corydoras in the manner of, for example, Corydoras septentrionalis. The captive spawning of this catfish has not been documented.

References
 

Corydoras
Fish described in 1996